Joseph Grimes (born 1996) is an Irish Gaelic footballer who plays at club level with Clonakilty and at inter-county level with the Cork senior football team. He usually lines out at midfield.

Career

Grimes first played competitive Gaelic football with the Listowel Emmets club, while also lining out for divisional side Feale Rangers. He transferred to the Clonakilty club in 2020, a move which saw him line out in the 2021 Cork PSFC final defeat by St. Finbarr's. Grimes first appeared on the inter-county scene when he was selected for the Cork senior football team for the pre-season McGrath Cup competition in 2022. He later earned inclusion on the team's National League panel.

Career statistics

References

1996 births
Living people
Clonakilty Gaelic footballers
Cork inter-county Gaelic footballers